St. Helena Island is situated between Round Bay and Little Round Bay in the Severn River,  upstream from Annapolis, Maryland and  south of Baltimore, Maryland.

History
Shards, clay pottery shards, stone chips, and grooved axes are evidence of the Woodland period peoples and later Native Americans who have occupied the island. It is thought that St. Helena and other small islands were used to hide from raiding Susquehannocks.

A preliminary search of Anne Arundel County, Maryland records in the Annapolis Land Office identifies the first traces of the island in 1843 when it was part of the estate of the late Annapolitan Major Richard I. Jones. An article from The Washington Post mentions "Uncle Tom" and the Chesapeake Fishing Club spending time on the island during the summer months of 1895, but it is not until nearly 40 years later that there is regular activity on St. Helena Island.

Paul Burnett, a Baltimore city attorney and insurance executive, purchased the island in the late 1920s. Claims that he named the island St. Helena as a tribute to his former law partner, a great-great nephew of Napoleon Bonaparte are not true; an 1846 map and the 1860 Martenet map both label the island "St. Helena."

Between 1929–1931, Burnett built a Federal Period mansion, part of the early-twentieth-century classical revival movement, modeled after the Homewood Museum on the Johns Hopkins University campus in Baltimore. He commissioned bay schooners to carry the tons of bricks necessary to build it. The mansion, built on a Palladian style five-part plan, occupies the crest of the island and is the centerpiece of St. Helena. There are six fireplaces, each in a different type of marble imported from Europe: many of the floors on the main level are marble checkerboards. Other flooring is made from inch-thick mahogany which dented the tools of electricians and telephone mechanics who attempted to string new wiring in the 1950s. There are also several safes built into the masonry, scattered throughout the house, including a walk-in size safe in the den. Several other homes on the island served as housing for patients and counselors of the Burnett Hospital for Crippled Children, which operated from 1936–1943. There are 22 structures total scattered through the island. There is also a conical roofed and a circular brick water tower on the northern point of the island, now converted to an office with a view.

Following Burnett's death in 1944, the island was sold to Eugene Raney, a beer distributor and operator of several bowling alleys in Maryland but who resided in Kensington, MD (Montgomery County). Raney leased several buildings, one of which would become a restaurant, to John Emory, well known for his Four Corners' restaurant in Silver Spring, Maryland. During this period, St. Helena was recognized for its swanky island club, boasting a casino and regularly hosting members of Congress, judges, and other prominent citizens, including Governor William Preston Lane Jr. The club was also home to several slot machines. In 1951 five nickel and two quarter slot machines, as well as two nickel "bandits" were seized in a police raid. Both Raney and Emory were taken into custody and later convicted of slot-machine violations. The owner of the machines, Nick Andrews of Glen Burnie, Maryland, was also convicted for illegal operation of slot machines on the island.

A c. 1955 report mentions the never-realized proposal that St. Helena ought to be bought by the State as a site of an institution for the criminally insane by County Manager Edward R. Lonergan who described his proposal as "a sort of Alcatraz Island of Maryland." The island was subdivided and sold in 1956, passing through several owners. Emmitt Brandt, president of Annapolis Utilities and Robert Merrick, chairman of the board of Equitable Trust occupied homes on the island.

Eugene Raney and his wife continued to use Paul Burnett's brick mansion as their personal vacation home, loaning it out to friends and business colleagues throughout and until the late 1950s. Raney finally sold the brick mansion to Judge Stedman Prescott Jr. of Maryland's Court of Appeals; in September 1961 Judge Prescott nearly lost his island mansion to a fire started by malfunctioning electrical equipment. The fire was brought under control by nearly 100 fireman rushed to the island by private boats from the Herald Harbor, Maryland.

In the late 1990s, controversy surrounded Little Round Bay and St. Helena when Keith Osborne of Fantasy Island Management Inc. purchased Prescott's mansion. Osborne promoted the  estate as a wedding and event center. After a great deal opposition from neighbors, the Severn River Association voted to oppose all commercial activity on the island in November 1999. Osborne stirred up more controversy in 2001, when he sold his portion of the island to the Hartman family and later that year, attempted to sue his former St. Helena neighbors Mary-Anne and Walter D. Pinkard Jr. and his brothers, Robert and Gregory Pinkard. The case was dropped and in 2002 Osborne was sentenced to 18 months in federal prison for tax evasion.

The Hartman and the Pinkard families still own the island today. The Hartman's northern 6.5 acres including the 1929 mansion were on the market in October 2014 for 3.9 million dollars

Geography
St. Helena Island is bordered on the east and south by the two-mile (3 km)-wide Round Bay, the only part of the generally straight and relatively narrow tidal Severn River to exceed three-quarters of a mile in width. Little Round Bay borders the island on the north and west and may have been a meander during a time when sea level was lower and the Severn was a freshwater river. Maynadier and Hopkins Creeks are 0.3 to 0.4 miles southwest of the southern tip of the island.

A 10–15 foot-wide beach can be found on the western side of the island and in the cove on the northeast side. St. Helena has only lost about 2 of its  in the last 150 years.

Wildlife
St. Helena is home to a variety of ducks, geese, great blue herons, kingfishers, ospreys and other birds. The island was formerly the setting for deer park.

References

Anne Arundel Police Record Called 'Poor'. (1951, July 19). The Washington Post, pg. 1

A Note on St. Helena Island, Maryland. (1953 February 10). The Baltimore Sun

Area Men and Slot Machines Seized in Raid on Island Club. (1951, July 24). The Washington Post, pg. 1

Burke, Scott. (2001, December). Judge Trims Island Lawsuit – Ex-owner of St. Helena Island can't sue neighbors in assault case. The Capital

Davison, A. T., & Rucker, C. B. (1988). Gems of the Severn. [Annapolis]: Severn River Commission, City of Annapolis, Anne Arundel County.

Developer admits false tax returns. (2002, April 12). The Capital

Farquhar, Roger B. (1951, September 8). 2 Montgomery Men Convicted In 'Slots' Case. The Washington Post, pg. 1

Graves, Aubrey. (1961, July 18). Yachtsmen Find 'Banishment' To St. Helena Most Enjoyable. The Washington Post, pg. A16

Illegal Use for Island? - County considers suing Fantasy Island owner. (1998, September 14). The Capital

Lane Brings Happiness to Boy Who Likes to Look at Notables. (1949, September 5). The Washington Post, pg. 4

Searchers Comb Island in Severn for 'Man-Eater'. (1955, May 10). The Washington Post, pg. 26

St. Helena Island. (1958, August 17). Baltimore News-American

The Judge's Severn Island. (1965, February 5). Baltimore News-American

Third Man at St. Helena Is Fined $500. (1951, September 9). The Washington Post, pg. M10

'Too Many Democrats' Says Johns. (1948, August 25). The Washington Post, pg. B1

Water-borne Firefighters Save Home. (1961, September 12). The Washington Post, pg. B1

Landforms of Anne Arundel County, Maryland
River islands of Maryland